Darkdrive is a science fiction movie which premiered in Canada in November 1997 and went straight to DVD in the USA. It stars Ken Olandt and Julie Benz. Darkdrive was the first DVD ever released in United Kingdom.

The movie is known for a small moment that was used in the season 4 intro of the television series South Park.

Plot
In the near future, a new law sends criminals to a virtual reality prison built by a shadowy corporation called Zircon based in Seattle. Steven Falcon, the designer of the system, realizes the dangers of it being overloaded and of hackers who try to break in and steal files only to have the prisoners try to break out via that method. When Falcon threatens to quit the operation he becomes marked for murder by his employers who force him to enter the virtual reality/afterlife to find the source of the danger of the system crashing.

Cast
Ken Olandt as Steven Falcon
Claire Stansfield as R.J. Tilda
Julie Benz as Julie Falcon
Gian Carlo Scandiuzzi as Matthew Stolopin
Brian Faker as Ben
Brian Finney as Bill
Marcus Aurelius as Dayton
Tony Doupe as Thackery
William Hall, Jr. as the Doorman at Zeak's

External links

1996 films
American science fiction films
Films about computing
Films about telepresence
1990s science fiction films
Films about virtual reality
Films set in prison
Films directed by Phillip J. Roth
1990s English-language films
1990s American films